English-language Indian films go back to the days of silent film. After the coming of sound, feature films in English almost disappeared.

History

Silent era
In the 1920s, films directed by Franz Osten and Himansu Rai, including The Light of Asia and A Throw of Dice, could be considered as English-language films because the titles were in English. With the coming of sound, directors such as Osten and Rai chose Hindi as the language, thus effectively bringing to a close this phase of English-language films made in India.

Crossover films

An attempt to make English talkies in India named Karma failed domestically in 1933.

Indian crossover films appeared in Indian cinema with international productions with Indian themes, starting with Merchant Ivory Productions' first venture, The Householder (1963), which has an India story, setting with an Indian cast, and included Shashi Kapoor, Leela Naidu, and Durga Khote. This was followed by a number of India-themed films largely propelled by Indian-born producer, Ismail Merchant. However, it took a while before an Indian director would commercially take up making films in the English language.

Indian productions
The first such film came at the peak of the Parallel cinema movement, when Aparna Sen directed 36 Chowringhee Lane (1981) to critical acclaim. Its lead actress, Jennifer Kendal was even nominated for a BAFTA Award. The genre was able to stand on its own with Dev Benegal's English, August (1994) which was widely accepted by urban audiences and became its first hit, drawing an audience of 20 million.

This paved the way for other directors to look at using English language as a viable medium, like Nagesh Kukunoor who made Hyderabad Blues (1998); Kaizad Gustad, Bombay Boys (1998); Homi Adajania, Being Cyrus (2006); and Rituporno Ghosh, whose The Last Lear (2008), starring Amitabh Bachchan as the lead, won the Best English Feature Award at National Film Award. 

In the 2000s, Aparna Sen visited the genre again, and made two successive English features in Mr. and Mrs. Iyer  (2002) and 15, Park Avenue  (2005), which won a string of National Film Awards.

Meanwhile, film directors of Indian descent, such as Mira Nair, Deepa Mehta, and Gurinder Chadha, continued to make English-language films on Indian themes to international acclaim; this has opened up the genre further both creatively and commercially.

List of films (partial)

See also
 National Film Award for Best Feature Film in English

References